Ben Lederman (born May 8, 2000) is a professional footballer who plays as a midfielder for Ekstraklasa club Raków Częstochowa. Born in the United States, he is a youth international for Poland.

Early life
Lederman was born in Los Angeles, California to Israeli expatriates of Polish-Jewish descent, Danny and Tammy. His father was a small business owner and his mother, a real estate agent. In 2011, the entire family moved to Barcelona so Ben could join La Masia, FC Barcelona's youth academy.

Club career
At age 11, Lederman was identified by scouts from FC Barcelona in a friendly match between his California State U10 team and FC Barcelona Academy Benjamin A. He was subsequently invited to train at La Masia and joined the academy thereafter.

In January 2020, Lederman left Belgium and joined Beitar Jerusalem on trial. He did not earn a contract with the Premier League side and instead signed with Liga Alef's Hakoah Amidar Ramat Gan. On February 14, 2020, Lederman made his first and only appearance for Hakoah Amidar Ramat Gan in a Liga Alef South match against Maccabi Sha'arayim. Lederman started and went 65 minutes before being replaced by Michael Ben Baruch in a 1-0 loss. Lederman was released by the club on February 27, 2020 so he could join Raków Częstochowa in the Polish Ekstraklasa.

Lederman made his first team debut on June 20, 2020, coming on as a substitute for David Tijanič in the 84th minute against Wisła Kraków. On May 2, 2021, Lederman won the first trophy of his professional career as Raków Częstochowa defeated Arka Gdynia in the final of the Polish Cup.

International career
Lederman represented United States at under-15 and under-17 levels.

In May 2021, he was invited to a training camp with the Poland under-21 team in Warka. Later that year, he earned his first official U21 call-up for 2023 UEFA European Under-21 Championship qualification matches against Germany U21 and Latvia U21 on 12 and 16 November 2021.

In March 2023, he received his first call-up to the Poland senior national team for the UEFA Euro 2024 qualifying matches against Czech Republic and Albania.

Personal life
Lederman is Jewish and celebrated his bar mitzvah at a local synagogue in Barcelona.

Career statistics

Club

Honours
Raków Częstochowa
Polish Cup: 2020–21, 2021–22
Polish Super Cup: 2021, 2022

Individual
Ekstraklasa Young Player of the Month: December 2021

References

2000 births
Living people
Soccer players from Los Angeles
Polish footballers
Poland under-21 international footballers
American soccer players
American people of Israeli descent
American people of Polish-Jewish descent
Polish people of Israeli descent
Polish people of American descent
Association football midfielders
Citizens of Poland through descent
Citizens of Israel through Law of Return
Jewish footballers
Jewish American sportspeople
Jewish Polish sportspeople
Jewish Israeli sportspeople
21st-century American Jews
Hakoah Maccabi Amidar Ramat Gan F.C. players
Ekstraklasa players
III liga players
Raków Częstochowa players
Polish expatriate footballers
American expatriate soccer players
Expatriate footballers in Spain
Polish expatriate sportspeople in Spain
American expatriate sportspeople in Spain
Expatriate footballers in Belgium
Polish expatriate sportspeople in Belgium
American expatriate sportspeople in Belgium
21st-century Polish Jews
Polish Ashkenazi Jews
American Jews from California
American Ashkenazi Jews